The Cavaliers–Warriors rivalry is a National Basketball Association (NBA) rivalry between the Cleveland Cavaliers and the Golden State Warriors. The rivalry primarily focuses on the four consecutive NBA Finals appearances between the two teams from 2015 to 2018. Cleveland and Golden State's Finals matchups are the most consecutive championships to feature the same teams in the four major North American sports.

The four championships saw the Warriors win three (2015, 2017, and 2018) and the Cavaliers win one (2016). The rivalry is considered to have ended in 2018 following LeBron James' departure from the Cavaliers to the Los Angeles Lakers.

Pre-2014 history
The Warriors dominated the early series, going 37–22 from 1970 to 1991. The Cavaliers would win 10 straight games from 1992 to 1996 to reduce Golden State's lead to 37–32. The two teams played each other close during LeBron James' first stint with the Cavaliers in the 2000s.

From 2010 to 2014, James left the Cavaliers to play for the Miami Heat to team up with Dwyane Wade and Chris Bosh going to the Finals each year winning championships in 2012 and 2013 while the Warriors were a lottery team.

The Warriors led the head-to-head series 53–50 through the end of the 2013–14 season.

James returned to the Cavaliers during the 2014 off-season. The Cavaliers then acquired All-Star power forward Kevin Love for Andrew Wiggins and other assets. The Cavaliers quickly became the favorite to win the East, as they already had an All-Star point guard in Kyrie Irving and other rising stars such as Tristan Thompson.

In the Western Conference, the Warriors were a team led by their backcourt of the "Splash Brothers", Stephen Curry and Klay Thompson, and a developed fast-paced, up-tempo offense, consisting mainly of three point shooting.

2014–15 season

With LeBron James returning to the Cavaliers as a free agent in 2014, the team was favored to make it to the NBA Finals. The team started off the season poorly, with Love struggling in his new role and SG Dion Waiters unable to handle being relegated to a secondary role. The Cavaliers started off the season with a dismal record of 19–20. James missed two weeks in January with a back injury. Later that month, the Cavaliers traded away Waiters to the Oklahoma City Thunder in a three-team deal with the New York Knicks. They acquired three-point specialist J. R. Smith and defensive asset Iman Shumpert. The team also acquired center and rim protector Timofey Mozgov in a separate trade. These players were critical for the team's return to the top of the Eastern Conference.
 
The Warriors started off the season 21–2, with a 16-game winning streak, which made them the early title favorites. Stephen Curry immediately became a Most Valuable Player candidate. Curry was improving off of last year's All-Star season. Klay Thompson became one of the best shooting guards, three-point shooters, and two-way players in the league. Draymond Green averaged  about 12 points, 8 rebounds, and 4 assists per game. Rookie head coach Steve Kerr was a candidate for Coach of the Year.

The two teams split their head-to-head meetings that season, each winning on its home court.

Irving, James, Curry, and Thompson were all named to their respective NBA All-Star teams, with Curry finishing first in the All-Star voting (1,513,324), and LeBron James finishing in second (1,470,483). Curry won the NBA MVP Award, averaging 23.8 points, 7.7 assists, and 2.0 steals per game, and shot 44.3% from three-point territory. James was third in MVP voting. He averaged 25.3 PPG, 6.0 RPG, and 7.4 APG. They were featured on the All-NBA First Team. Irving and Thompson made the All-NBA team as well. The Cavaliers finished the season with a record of 53–29, and the Warriors finished the season with a record of 67–15.

2015 NBA Finals

The Warriors and the Cavaliers only lost five games combined in the first three rounds of the playoffs. For the first time in NBA Finals history, both teams were coached by rookie head coaches with Steve Kerr and David Blatt. The Cavaliers faced injury trouble, losing Love in the first round against the Boston Celtics to a separated shoulder. Irving left Game 1 of the Finals in overtime after fracturing his left kneecap. The Warriors won Game 1 in a 108–100 overtime thriller. Game 2 also went into overtime, the all-around efforts of LeBron James and Matthew Dellavedova's surprisingly stellar defense on Steph Curry took the game 95–93. James had carried the limping Cavaliers to a Game 3 win and a 2–1 lead over the Warriors. The Warriors would win the next three games to take home the 2015 NBA Championship. Andre Iguodala would win the NBA Finals MVP, although James averaged 35.8 PPG, 13.3 RPG, and 8.8 APG in a losing effort.

2015–16 season

  

The Warriors opened the 2015–16 season going 24–0, the most wins without a loss to start a season in NBA history and the second-longest winning streak in NBA history (33, by the 1971-72 Los Angeles Lakers). By the All-Star break, the Warriors' record was a stellar 48–4, including a pair of regular season victories against Cleveland. This was the best record at an all-star break in league history. Curry, Thompson, and Draymond Green earned all-star selections. Golden State went on to break the 1995–96 Chicago Bulls' 72–10 season record by winning 73 games. Stephen Curry became the first unanimous MVP in the history of the NBA that year.

Despite their regular season dominance, the Warriors struggled in the Western Conference playoffs. After defeating the Houston Rockets and Portland Trail Blazers each in five games without Curry for several games due to injuries, the Warriors were pushed to seven games by the Oklahoma City Thunder in the Western Conference Finals. The Thunder jumped to a 3–1 lead, but the Warriors were able to battle their way back and win the series.

The Cavaliers faced some challenges in the 2015–16 campaign. Irving was recovering from a knee injury sustained in Game 1 of the previous season's Finals and would miss most of the first half of the season. Despite some hardship, Cleveland performed well throughout the first half of the season. Halfway through the campaign, with a record of 30–11, head coach David Blatt was replaced by Tyronn Lue. The team finished the regular season with the best record in the Eastern Conference, sweeping the Detroit Pistons and Atlanta Hawks, and defeated the Toronto Raptors in 6 games to advance to the Finals against the defending champion Warriors.

Finals for the ages

The 2016 NBA Finals saw the Cavaliers and Warriors meet for the second straight season. The Warriors won Games 1 and 2 in Oakland quite convincingly before the series moved to Cleveland. While Cleveland won Game 3 at home in convincing fashion, the Warriors took Game 4 to set up a potential series-clincher at home. During the game, Draymond Green committed a flagrant foul on LeBron James. After reviewing the incident post-game, the league determined that the altercation warranted a flagrant 1 foul, which put Green over the NBA's flagrant foul limit and meant that he would be suspended for Game 5.

Kyrie Irving and LeBron James both scored 41 points in Game 5 to stay alive on the road, becoming the first pair of teammates to score at least 40 points in a Finals game. Back in Cleveland, LeBron James continued his explosive scoring, tallying another 41-point game in a Game 6 rout of the Warriors that saw a dominating 31–9 opening sequence and a late-game ejection of Stephen Curry. James became the first player since Shaquille O'Neal to score over 40 points in back-to-back NBA Finals games.

With the series shifting back to Oracle Arena for the championship decider, the Warriors and the Cavaliers were neck-and-neck for most of Game 7. Late in the 4th quarter, with the score tied 89–89, LeBron James made a memorable chasedown block on Andre Iguodala to save a go-ahead basket. Soon after, Kyrie Irving hit a 3-pointer over Stephen Curry to give Cleveland the lead, and they held on to win the game 93–89. This was Cleveland's first franchise title and made them first team in NBA Finals history to come back from a 3–1 deficit. LeBron James became only the third player in NBA history to have a triple double in a Finals Game 7 and was unanimously voted Finals MVP after leading in all five categories of points, rebounds, assists, steals, and blocks.

2016–2018: Arrival of Kevin Durant

On July 4, 2016, Oklahoma City Thunder star Kevin Durant signed with the Warriors in free agency. He averaged 25.1 PPG, 8.3 RPG, 4.8 APG, 1.1 SPG, and 1.6 BPG. After finishing 67–15, the first team in NBA history to win at least 67 games in three straight seasons, the Warriors went 12–0 in the Western Conference playoffs. They became the third team in league history to sweep all three rounds after the Los Angeles Lakers (1988–89 and 2000–01), doing it against the Portland Trail Blazers, Utah Jazz, and San Antonio Spurs, and the first to do so going 12–0 (the previous teams went 11–0 when the first round was best-of-five).

In the Eastern Conference, the Cavaliers willfully made it to the Finals, going 12–1, cruising past the Indiana Pacers and Toronto Raptors in convincing series sweeps. In the Conference Finals, the Cavaliers defeated the Boston Celtics in five games. James was considered to be playing his best basketball of his career, entering the Finals averaging 32.5 PPG, 8.0 RPG, 7.0 APG, 2.2 SPG, and 1.4 BPG. He shot 57% from the field and 42% from three. James averaged a triple double in the Finals. Kevin Love also played his best basketball as a Cavalier, averaging 17.2 PPG 10.4 RPG, 1.9 APG, shooting 46% from the field, and 44% from behind the arc. Kyrie Irving set a career playoff-high 42 points during Game 4 of the Eastern Conference Finals against Boston. The Warriors and Cavaliers had a combined 24–1 record entering the Finals, the fewest combined losses entering the Finals ever.

The series faced high anticipation as the Warriors, now dubbed as a "super-team", looked for revenge on their East coast foe from the previous year's loss. The Warriors easily took Games 1 and 2 at home, defeating the Cavaliers 113–91, and 132–113. Game 3 looked to be in the Cavs' favor, until an 11–0 run by the Warriors in the closing minutes emerged, capped off by a dagger three from Kevin Durant to seal a 118–113 comeback victory. Down 3–0, James and Irving led the Cavaliers over the Warriors to a 137–116 win, including a record-breaking 49 points in the first quarter, a Finals-high 86 points in the first half, and a record 24 3–pointers (which broke the record of 18 set by the Warriors in Game 2). Durant and the Warriors looked to finish the series back home in Game 5. Despite early domination from James and Cleveland in Game 5, the Warriors surged ahead in the second half, fending off several late-game Cavaliers rallies, and won the title with a 129–120 victory. It was the team's second title in three years, and Durant's first championship and Finals MVP.

In 2017–18, Golden State won the two regular-season meetings against the Cavaliers, but struggled down the stretch with multiple All-Star injuries. However, fueled by the return of Stephen Curry during the playoffs, the Warriors dominated the first and second rounds of the playoffs against the San Antonio Spurs and New Orleans Pelicans each in five games and advanced to their fourth consecutive Finals by overcoming a 3–2 deficit against the Houston Rockets. Cleveland also struggled during the second half of the season after overhauling their roster at the trade deadline with new, younger players. However, they still managed to beat the Indiana Pacers in seven games, sweep the Raptors, then overcome their own 3–2 deficit against the Boston Celtics to advance to the Finals. It was the first time that the same two teams in any of North America's four major professional sports leagues have met for a championship round four consecutive times.

Game 1 was close with several lead changes. James would score 51 points. However, the game went to overtime, in part due to a controversial reversed charging foul call against Durant, a missed go-ahead free throw by George Hill with 4.7 seconds left, and JR Smith subsequently rebounding and dribbling out the clock, mistakenly believing his team to be ahead. The Warriors would dominate overtime, winning the game 124–114. Several minor scuffles ensued in the closing seconds of overtime, culminating in Tristan Thompson getting ejected and later fined for shoving a basketball into the face of Draymond Green. After the game, LeBron James reportedly suffered a self-inflicted bone contusion onto his right hand after punching a whiteboard in the locker room. He played through the injury for the rest of the series, and it was not disclosed until after Game 4.

Game 2 was a more one-sided affair, with the Warriors winning 122–103. Curry would break his own NBA Finals record with nine 3-pointers in a Finals game.

Game 3 was also close, as the teams exchanged leads several times. Curry struggled from the field, shooting only 3–16 (1–10 on 3's), while James set a record with his 10th Finals triple-double. However, Durant would lead the Warriors to a 110–102 victory, scoring a playoff career-high 43 points, along with another clutch three.

Game 4 was a blowout victory for the Warriors, 108–85, led by Curry's 37 points (including seven 3-pointers) and Durant's first career playoff triple-double. Golden State thus completed the sweep, earning their second consecutive championship, third in four seasons, and sixth, overall.

Aftermath of the rivalry
The rivalry is considered to have ended after LeBron James left the Cavaliers and signed with the Los Angeles Lakers in 2018. The Cavaliers entered a rebuild centered around their 2018 first round draft pick Collin Sexton, and later their 2019 first round draft pick Darius Garland, while retaining Tristan Thompson and Kevin Love to serve as veteran leaders. The Cavaliers struggled in their next two seasons, finishing 19–63 in 2018–19 and 19–46 in the 2019–20 season prior to its suspension due to the COVID-19 pandemic.  The Cavaliers were not among the 22 teams invited to complete the season. The team fired Lue six games into the 2018–19 season. They hired former University of Michigan head coach John Beilein before the 2019–20 season, though he resigned midway through that season.  Assistant coach J.B. Bickerstaff was named interim head coach and eventually full-time head coach for the 2020–21 season. The Cavaliers nearly returned to the playoffs in the 2021–22 season, but lost to the Atlanta Hawks in the NBA Play-In Tournament for the 8th seed. 

The Warriors returned to their fifth straight Finals in 2019, aiming for a three-peat, but lost to the Toronto Raptors, . Kevin Durant and Andre Iguodala left the Warriors for the Brooklyn Nets and Memphis Grizzlies, respectively, in the 2019 offseason. These losses, combined with injuries to Klay Thompson and Stephen Curry, led the Warriors to finish an NBA-worst 15–50 in the shortened 2019–20 season and not be invited to finish the season.

The Warriors returned to the Finals in 2022. Iguodala returned back to Golden State after two years with the Memphis Grizzlies and Miami Heat. Curry and Thompson returned after missing much of the prior two seasons due to injuries. The Warriors defeated the Boston Celtics (in a rematch of the 1964 Finals) in six games to win their fourth title in eight years and seventh overall.

The teams have played nine games since James' departure, with the Warriors holding a perfect 9–0 record.

Players of note
Since the 2014–15 NBA season, LeBron James and Stephen Curry have been viewed as the faces of the Cavaliers and Warriors, respectively. Coincidentally, they were born in the same hospital in Akron, Ohio. On the Cavaliers, Kevin Love, J. R. Smith, and Tristan Thompson are the only other players to have appeared in all four NBA Finals matchups. Andre Iguodala, Draymond Green, Klay Thompson, and Shaun Livingston are likewise the only other Warriors to have made all four NBA Finals matchups with the team.

Anderson Varejão has the distinction of having played for both the Cavaliers and the Warriors, sitting courtside due to injury in the 2015 NBA Finals with Cleveland and playing in the 2016 NBA Finals with Golden State.

Results (2014–present)

See also
 List of National Basketball Association rivalries
 Death Lineup
 Celtics–Lakers rivalry – the most popular rivalry in NBA history, with both teams having played each other in the NBA Finals twelve times in five different decades

References

Cleveland Cavaliers
Golden State Warriors
National Basketball Association rivalries